Hefdah-e-Shahrivar Metro Station is a station of Mashhad Metro Line 1. The station opened on 10 October 2011. It is located on Fada'ian-e Eslam Blvd.

References

Mashhad Metro stations
Railway stations opened in 2011
2011 establishments in Iran